Lieutenant Edward Gordon Gedge    (3 May 1895 – 17 March 1991) was a British modern pentathlete. He competed at the 1920 Summer Olympics.

During the First World War, he served with the Royal Field Artillery. He was awarded the Military Cross in the 1918 Birthday Honours, "for distinguished service in connection with Military Operations in Salonika."

References

External links
 

1895 births
1991 deaths
British male modern pentathletes
Olympic modern pentathletes of Great Britain
Modern pentathletes at the 1920 Summer Olympics
People from Gosport
Recipients of the Military Cross
British Army personnel of World War I
Royal Field Artillery officers